Huo Qubing (140 BC – October 117 BC) was a Chinese military general and politician of the Western Han dynasty during the reign of Emperor Wu of Han. He was a nephew of the general Wei Qing and Empress Wei Zifu (Emperor Wu's wife), and a half-brother of the statesman Huo Guang. The Records of the Grand Historian by the ancient scholar Sima Qian also list him as a male favorite (i.e., lover) of the Emperor. Along with Wei Qing, he led a campaign into the Gobi Desert of what is now Mongolia to defeat the Xiongnu nomadic confederation, winning decisive victories such as the Battle of Mobei in 119 BC.

Early life
Huo Qubing was an illegitimate son from the love affair between Wei Shaoer, the daughter of a lowly maid from the household of Princess Pingyang (Emperor Wu's older sister), and Huo Zhongru, a low-ranking civil servant employed there at the time.  However, Huo Zhongru did not want to marry a lower class serf girl like Wei Shaoer, so he abandoned her and went away to marry a woman from his home town instead.  Wei Shaoer insisted on keeping the child, raising him with help of her siblings.

When Huo Qubing was around two years old, his younger aunt Wei Zifu, who was serving as an in-house singer/dancer for Princess Pingyang, caught the attention of the young Emperor Wu, who took her and her half-brother Wei Qing back to his palace in the capital, Chang'an.  More than a year later, the newly favoured concubine Wei Zifu became pregnant with Emperor Wu's first child, earning her the jealousy and hatred of Emperor Wu's then empress consort, Empress Chen.  Empress Chen's mother, Grand Princess Guantao, then attempted to retaliate against Wei Zifu by kidnapping and attempting to murder Wei Qing, who was then serving as a horseman at the Jianzhang Camp (建章營, Emperor Wu's royal guards).  After Wei Qing was rescued by fellow palace guards led by his close friend Gongsun Ao, Emperor Wu took the opportunity to humiliate Empress Chen and Princess Guantao by promoting Wei Zifu to a consort (夫人, a concubine position lower only to the Empress) and Wei Qing to the triple role of Chief of Jianzhang Camp, Chief of Staff, and Chief Councillor, effectively making him one of Emperor Wu's closest lieutenants.  The rest of the Wei family were also well rewarded, including the decreed marriage of Wei Shaoer's older sister Wei Junru to Emperor Wu's adviser, Gongsun He.  At the time, Wei Shaoer was romantically engaged with Chen Zhang, a great-grandson of Emperor Gaozu's adviser Chen Ping.  Their relationship was also legitimized by Emperor Wu through the form of decreed marriage. Through the rise of the Wei family, the young Huo Qubing grew up in prosperity and prestige.

Military career
Huo Qubing exhibited outstanding military talent even as a teenager.  Emperor Wu saw Huo's potential and made Huo his personal assistant.

In 123 BC, Emperor Wu sent Wei Qing from Dingxiang to engage the invading Xiongnu, and appointed the 18-year-old Huo Qubing to serve as the Captain of Piaoyao under his uncle, seeing real combat for the first time.  Although Wei Qing was able to kill or capture more than 10,000 Xiongnu soldiers, part of his vanguard forces, a 3,000-strong regiment commanded by generals Su Jian (蘇建, father of the Han diplomat and statesman, Su Wu) and Zhao Xin (趙信, a surrendered Xiongnu prince) was outnumbered and annihilated after encountering the Xiongnu force led by Yizhixie Chanyu.  Zhao Xin defected on the field with his 800 ethnic Xiongnu subordinates, while Su Jian escaped after losing all his men in the desperate fighting.  Due to the loss of this detachment, Wei Qing's troops did not earn any promotion, but Huo Qubing distinguished himself by leading a long-distance search-and-destroy mission with 800 light cavalrymen, killing the Chanyu's grandfather and over 2,000 enemy troops, as well as capturing numerous Xiongnu nobles.  A very impressed Emperor Wu then made Huo Qubing the Marquess of Champion with a march of 2,500 households.

In 121 BC, Emperor Wu deployed Huo Qubing twice in that year against the Xiongnu in the Hexi Corridor.  During spring, Huo Qubing led 10,000 cavalry, fought through five Western Regions kingdoms within 6 days, advanced over 1,000 li over Mount Yanzhi, killed two Xiongnu princes along with nearly 9,000 enemy troops, and captured several Xiongnu nobles as well as the Golden Man idol used by Xiongnu as an artifact for holy rituals. For this achievement, his march was increased by 2,200 households. During the summer of the same year, Xiongnu attacked the Dai Commandery and Yanmen.  Huo Qubing set off from Longxi (modern-day Gansu) with over 10,000 cavalry, supported by Gongsun Ao, who set off from the Beidi Commandery (北地郡).  Despite Gongsun Ao failing to keep up, Huo Qubing travelled over 2,000 li without backup, all the way past Juyan Lake to Qilian Mountains, killing over 30,000 Xiongnu soldiers and capturing a dozen Xiongnu princes.  His march was then increased further by a 5,400 households for the victory.

Huo Qubing's victories dealt heavy blows to the tribes of the Xiongnu princes of Hunxie and Xiutu that occupied the Hexi Corridor.  Out of frustration, Yizhixie Chanyu wanted to mercilessly execute those two princes as punishment. The Prince of Hunxie contacted the Han government in autumn of 121 BC to negotiate a surrender. Failing to persuade his fellow prince to do the same, he killed the Prince of Xiutu and ordered Xiutu's forces to also surrender.  When the two tribes went to meet the Han forces, Xiutu's forces rioted.  Seeing the situation changed, Huo Qubing alone headed to the Xiongnu camp. There, the general ordered the Prince of Hunxie to calm his men and stand down before putting down 8,000 Xiongnu men who refused to disarm, effectively quelling the riot.  The Hunxie tribe was then resettled into the Central Plain.  The surrender of the Xiutu and Hunxie tribes stripped Xiongnu of any control over the Western Regions, depriving them of a large grazing area.  As a result, Han Dynasty successfully opened up the Northern Silk Road, allowing direct trade access to Central Asia.  This also provided a new supply of high-quality horse breeds from Central Asia, including the famed Ferghana horse (ancestors of the modern Akhal-Teke), further strengthening the Han army.  Emperor Wu then reinforced this strategic asset by establishing five commanderies and constructing a length of fortified wall along the border of the Hexi Corridor. He colonised the area with 700,000 Chinese soldier-settlers.

After the series of defeats by Wei Qing and Huo Qubing, Yizhixie Chanyu took Zhao Xin's advice and retreated with his tribes to the north of the Gobi Desert, hoping that the barren land would serve as a natural barrier against Han offensives.  Emperor Wu however, was far from giving up, and planned a massive expeditionary campaign in 119 BC.  Han forces were deployed in two separate columns, each consisting of 50,000 cavalry and over 100,000 infantry, with Wei Qing and Huo Qubing serving as the supreme commander for each.

Emperor Wu, who had been distancing Wei Qing and giving the younger Huo Qubing more attention and favour, hoped that Huo would engage the stronger Chanyu's tribe and preferentially assigned him the most elite troopers.  The initial plan called for Huo Qubing to attack from Dingxiang (定襄, modern-day Qingshuihe County, Inner Mongolia) and engage the Chanyu, with Wei Qing supporting him in the east from Dai Commandery (代郡, modern-day, Yu County, Hebei) to engage the Left Worthy Prince.  However, a Xiongnu prisoner of war confessed that the Chanyu's main force was at the east side.  Unaware that this was actually false information provided by the Xiongnu, Emperor Wu ordered the two columns to switch routes, with Wei Qing now setting off on the western side from Dingxiang, and Huo Qubing marching on the eastern side from the Dai Commandery.

Battles at the eastern Dai Commandery theatre were quite straightforward, as Huo Qubing's forces were far superior to their enemies.  Huo Qubing advanced over 2,000 li and directly engaged the Left Worthy Prince in a swift and decisive battle.  He quickly encircled and overran the Xiongnu, killing over 70,000 men, and capturing three lords and 83 nobles, while suffering a 20% casualty rate that was quickly resupplied from local captives.  He then went on to conduct a series of rituals upon his arrival at the Khentii Mountains (狼居胥山, and the more northern 姑衍山) to symbolize the historic Han victory, then continued his pursuit as far as Lake Baikal, effectively annihilating the Xiongnu clan and allowing conquering tribe such as the Donghu People to retake back their land to establish their own confederacy to declared independent from Xiongnu Overlord following the subjugation for over a few decade.  A separate division led by Lu Bode, set off on a strategically flanking route from Right Beiping (右北平, modern-day Ningcheng County, Inner Mongolia), joined forces with Huo Qubing after arriving in time with 2,800 enemy kills, and the combined forces then returned in triumph.  This victory earned Huo Qubing 5,800 households of fiefdom as a reward, making him more distinguished than his uncle Wei Qing. At the height of his career, many low-ranking commanders previously served under Wei Qing voluntarily transferred to Huo Qubing's service in the hope of achieving military glory with him.

Death and legacy

Emperor Wu offered to help Huo Qubing build up a household for marriage. Huo Qubing, however, answered that "the Xiongnu are not yet eliminated, why should I start a family?" (匈奴未滅，何以家為？), a statement that became an inspirational Chinese patriotic motto.  Though Huo Qubing was recorded as a quietly spoken man of few words, he was far from humble. Sima Qian noted in Shiji that Huo Qubing paid little regard to his men, refusing to share his food with his soldiers, and regularly ordering his troops to conduct cuju games despite them being short on rations. When Emperor Wu suggested him to study The Art of War by Sun Tzu and Wuzi by Wu Qi, Huo Qubing claimed that he naturally understood war strategies and had no need to study. When his subordinate Li Gan (李敢, son of Li Guang) assaulted Wei Qing, the latter forgave the incident. Huo Qubing, on the other hand, refused to tolerate such disrespect towards his uncle and personally shot Li Gan during a hunting trip. Emperor Wu covered for Qubing, stating that Li Gan was "killed by a deer".

When it came to military glory, Huo Qubing was said to be more generous.  One story about him told of when Emperor Wu awarded Huo a jar of precious wine for his achievement, he poured it into a creek so all his men drinking the water could share a taste of it, giving the name to the city of Jiuquan (酒泉, literally "wine spring").

Huo Qubing died in 117 BC at the early age of 23. After Huo Qubing's death, the aggrieved Emperor Wu ordered the elite troops from the five border commanderies to line up all the way from Chang'an to Maoling, where Huo Qubing's tomb was constructed in the shape of the Qilian Mountains to commemorate his military achievements. Huo Qubing was then posthumously appointed the title Marquess of Jinghuan, and a large "Horse Stomping Xiongnu" stone statue was built in front of his tomb, near Emperor Wu's tomb of Maoling.

Huo Qubing was among the most decorated military commanders in Chinese history.  The Eastern Han Dynasty historian Ban Gu, summarized in his Book of Han Huo Qubing's achievements with a poem:
The Champion of Piaoji, fast and brave.Six long-distance assaults, like lightning and thunder.Watering horse at Lake Baikal, conducting rituals at Khentii Mountains.Conquering the area west of great river, establishing commanderies along Qilian Mountains.
票騎冠軍，猋勇紛紜，長驅六擧，電擊雷震，飲馬翰海，封狼居山，西規大河，列郡祁連。

Huo Qubing's half-brother, Huo Guang, whom he took custody away from his father, was later a great statesman who was the chief counsel for Emperor Zhao, and was instrumental in the succession of Emperor Xuan to the throne after Emperor Zhao's death.

Huo Qubing's son, Huo Shàn, succeeded him as the Marquess of Jinghuan but died young in 110 BC.  So Huo Qubing's title became extinct.  His grandson Huo Shān (霍山, later Marquess of Leping) and Huo Yun (霍云, later Marquess of Guanyang) were involved in a failed plot to overthrow Emperor Xuan of Han in 66 BC, resulting in both of them committing suicide and the Huo clan being executed. It is presumed that no male descendants of Huo Qubing or Huo Guang survived, as during the reign of Emperor Ping of Han, it was Huo Yang, a great-grandson of Huo Qubing's paternal cousin, who was chosen as the descendant of Huo Guang to be the Marquess of Bolu.

Popular culture 
Huo Qubing is one of the 32 historical figures who appear as special characters in the video game Romance of the Three Kingdoms XI by Koei.

Huo Qubing was played by Li Junfeng in the popular 2005 historical epics TV series The Emperor in Han Dynasty.

Huo Qubing was played by Eddie Peng under the name of Wei Wuji  in the popular romance Chinese drama Sound of the Desert derived from the book Da Mo Yao/Ballad of the Desert by famous novel writer Tong Hua.

Huo Qubing is also mentioned in the blockbuster film Dragon Blade, where the main character, played by Jackie Chan, is said to have been raised up by him. Actor Feng Shaofeng portrays the general in brief flashbacks.

See also 
 Emperor Wu of Han
 Han–Xiongnu War
 Jin Midi
 Ban Chao

Notes

References 
 Joseph P Yap Wars with the Xiongnu – A translation From Zizhi tongjian AuthorHouse (2009) 

140 BC births
117 BC deaths
Han dynasty generals from Shaanxi
Han dynasty politicians from Shaanxi
Politicians from Xi'an